Henry Engard Gilroy (1852 – October 31, 1907) was a Major League Baseball catcher.

Gilroy played in 10 games, eight with Chicago and two with Philadelphia.

External links

Retrosheet

1852 births
1907 deaths
Philadelphia Athletics (NA) players
Chicago White Stockings players
Major League Baseball catchers
19th-century baseball players